Big Baby DRAM is the debut studio album by American rapper DRAM. It was released on October 21, 2016, by Empire Distribution and Atlantic Records. The album features guest appearances from Young Thug, Erykah Badu, Lil Yachty, Playboi Carti, Trippie Redd, ASAP Rocky, and Juicy J, while the production was handled by Charlie Heat, Mike Dean, Ricky Reed, and Roofeeo, among others.

Big Baby DRAM received generally positive reviews from critics and debuted at number 19 on the US Billboard 200. The album was supported by four official singles: "Broccoli", "Cute", "Cash Machine", and "Gilligan".

Promotion
"Broccoli" was released as the album's lead single on April 6, 2016. The song features a guest appearance from American rapper Lil Yachty, while the production was handled by J Gramm, with additional production by Rogét Chahayed and Karl Rubin. The song's accompanying music video premiered on July 22, 2016, on DRAM's YouTube account. On September 21, 2018, the single was certified seven-times platinum by the Recording Industry Association of America (RIAA).

"Cute" was released as the album's second single on July 29, 2016. The track was produced by Charlie Heat.

"Cash Machine" was released as the album's third single on September 9, 2016. The track was produced by Ricky Reed. The music video for the single premiered on October 18, 2016.

"Gilligan" was first released for digital download on April 21, 2017. The song features guest appearances from American rappers ASAP Rocky and Juicy J. The song later sent to rhythmic contemporary radio on July 18, 2017, as the album's fourth single.

The album's first promotional single, "Ill Nana", was released on September 29, 2017. The song features a guest appearance from American rapper Trippie Redd.

The album's second promotional single, "Crumbs", was released on November 17, 2017. The song features a guest appearance from American rapper Playboi Carti.

Critical reception

Big Baby DRAM was met with generally positive reviews. At Metacritic, which assigns a normalized rating out of 100 to reviews from professional publications, the album received an average score of 80, based on 13 reviews. Aggregator AnyDecentMusic? gave it 7.5 out of 10, based on their assessment of the critical consensus.

Neil Z. Yeung of AllMusic said, "Big Baby D.R.A.M. is, at times, odd and imperfect, which is part of the charm". James Kilpin of Clash said, "It's refreshing to hear something different and altogether more interesting from a slighter older but no less exciting name". Michael Madden of Consequence said, "It'll be interesting to see how those sorts of lyrics sound 10, 15, or 20 years down the line, but at the very least, Big Baby D.R.A.M.s melodies and instrumentation are enough to ensure people will be listening to these songs for a while". Tim Jonze of The Guardian said, "The Virginia rapper's playfulness is frequently channelled through his talent for crafting delightfully weird pop". Eric Diep of HipHopDX said, "Big Baby D.R.A.M. is presented as a playlist of D.R.A.M.'s best conceptual songs rather than achieve the glory of playing a perfect album from front to back". Christine Clarke of Now said, "The dizzying array of styles and themes always entertain, and D.R.A.M.'s confidence as both a singer and rapper allows him to pull these threads together". August Brown of Los Angeles Times said, "With Big Baby D.R.A.M. he comes into his own, rapping with verve and sensitivity while fully capturing 2016's loopy, soulful moment in hip-hop. No wonder he's smiling".

Jon Caramanica of The New York Times said, "His excellent full-length debut album, Big Baby D.R.A.M., is joyous, clever and moves in surprising directions". Daniel Bromfield of Pretty Much Amazing said, "Big Baby D.R.A.M. makes it clear he's interested in a lot more than just writing breezy radio tunes. The only problem is that's unequivocally what he's best at". Jayson Greene of Pitchfork said, "D.R.A.M. doesn't really have new ideas to pitch into this ball pit, but on his full-length debut Big Baby D.R.A.M., he reminds us that new ideas aren't the whole game". Christopher R. Weingarten of Rolling Stone said, "Love or hate his broken style, he's the Biz Markie for the era where it goes down in the D.M." Scott Glaysher of XXL said, "Big Baby D.R.A.M. does have moments where tracks like "Sweet VA Breeze" and "WiFi" easily blend into each other, sounding a bit too similar. But those middling songs don't really hinder the overall replay value of the album".

Year-end lists

Track listing
Credits adapted from the liner notes of Big Baby DRAM by Atlantic Records.

Notes
  signifies a co-producer
  signifies an additional producer
 "Ill Nana" is stylized as "ILL Nana"

Sample credits
 "Cash Machine" contains a sample from "Hallelujah I Love Her So", as performed by Ray Charles.
 "100%" contains a sample from "The Highways of My Life", as performed by The Isley Brothers.
 "Sweet VA Breeze" contains an interpolation from "Sweet Virginia Breeze", as written and performed by Steve Bassett and Robert Thompson.

Charts

Weekly charts

Year-end charts

Certifications

Release history

References

2016 debut albums
Atlantic Records albums
Empire Distribution albums
Albums produced by Cardo
Albums produced by Cubeatz
Albums produced by Juicy J
Albums produced by Mike Dean (record producer)
Albums produced by Sonny Digital
DRAM (musician) albums
Albums produced by Rogét Chahayed